GuideDoc is a global online streaming and distributing service for documentary films, founded by Víctor Correal in Barcelona, Spain.

GuideDoc started in 2014 with 20 documentaries; many these, such as the 2009 Sins of My Father and Skateistan: To Live and Skate Kabul, Little World (2012) and I Am Breathing (2013) achieved critical acclaim. As of January 2019, the site had over 400 documentaries, all of which have subtitles in both English and Spanish. The service works as a subscription video and TV on-demand platform for several devices.

References

External links 
 

2014 establishments in Spain
Video on demand services
IOS software